Phanocerus is a genus of riffle beetles in the family Elmidae. There are about seven described species in Phanocerus.

Species
These seven species belong to the genus Phanocerus:
 Phanocerus bugnioni Grouvelle, 1902
 Phanocerus charopus Spangler, 1966
 Phanocerus claricornis
 Phanocerus clavicornis Sharp, 1882
 Phanocerus congener Grouvelle, 1898
 Phanocerus rufus Maier, 2013
 Phanocerus sharpi Grouvelle, 1896

References

Further reading

 
 
 
 
 

Elmidae
Articles created by Qbugbot